Eupithecia nobilitata is a moth in the  family Geometridae. It is found in Russia (the South Siberian Mountains).

References

Moths described in 1882
nobilitata
Moths of Asia